Polska Roma are the largest and one of the oldest ethnolinguistic sub group of Romani people living in Poland. Some Polska Roma also live in North America, Switzerland, Sweden, Great Britain and countries of the European Union. The term "Polska Roma" is both an ethnonym of the group and a term used in the academic literature. As such it is distinct from the terms "Polish Roma" or "Roma in Poland" which better denote the broader Roma population in Poland. Polish ethnographer Jerzy Ficowski, writing in the 1950s and 1960s used the term "Polish Lowlander Gypsies" (Polish: Polscy Cyganie Nizinni) to refer to the same group, though this terminology is no longer in widespread use.

Culture
Polska Roma were nomadic until the twentieth century. They have not assimilated into broader Polish society or the non-Romani cultures of other countries where they live. They are in fact one of the most traditional Romani groups. One exception to this is that the most common surnames among Polska Roma are characteristically Polish (for example Kwiatkowski or Majewski), or occasionally Polonized-German (for example Wajs or Szwarc). Polska Roma generally have had a very strict interpretation of Romanipen cultural laws and practices. Some cultural differences arose however within the community during and after World War II because those of the Polska Roma who spent the war in areas controlled by the Soviet Union were able to hold on to orthodox practice, while those under German occupation and threatened by genocide had to compromise the strictness of their traditions in order to survive.

They are closely related to Xaladitka Roma, or "Ruska Roma" who emigrated to the Polish–Lithuanian Commonwealth together with the Polska Roma. Because the Xaladitka settled in regions of present-day Belarus, they became more affected by Ruthenian, rather than Polish, culture.

History

Origins

Polska Roma as a distinct ethnolinguistic group formed during the 16th century in western Poland from Roma refugees who had migrated to the Polish–Lithuanian Commonwealth in order to escape anti-Romani persecution in the Holy Roman Empire. The migration was a result of a wave of pogroms, persecutions and anti-Romani laws in German territories and this had a profound effect on Polska Roma's culture and language. Compared to other Roma groups, such as the Bergitka Roma (Polish Carpathian Gypsies or Polish Highlander Gypsies in Ficowski's terminology) who had actually arrived in Poland earlier in the 15th century, the communities of Polska Roma are more closed and suspicious of outsiders (Gadjo), less "assimilated", and more tied to traditional Roma culture. Their version of the Roma dialect has also incorporated many German words and idioms.

In the Polish–Lithuanian Commonwealth

Between the 16th and 18th centuries, the Polish–Lithuanian Commonwealth, like other European states, passed anti-Roma legislation. However, unlike in most European countries, these laws were rarely enforced in large measure because the Roma found powerful protectors among the Szlachta (Polish nobility) and benign neglect. Polish nobles, magnates and landowners, placed a high value on the traditional crafts of the Roma, such as metallurgy, farming, and wheelwrighting, as well musical skills (which became a standard staple of important occasions), the Polska Roma were usually exempted from the feudal restrictions that tied Polish peasants to the land. They were free to continue the nomadic lifestyle during most of the year, as long as they arrived in the "home town" on pre-specified market days. In that respect, the Polska Roma occupied social strata above that of the Polish peasants and other Roma populations, such as the Carpathian Roma (whose mobility was restricted).

In many large magnate latifundia, the communities of Polska Roma were also given the right to have a "king," chosen to represent them in legal disputes with outsiders. However, over time, the office became a source of corruption. In the 18th and 19th centuries, the persons were often chosen from outside their group and tended to pursue personal rather than community interests.

Additional anti-Roma laws were passed in Poland and Lithuania when Augustus the Strong, the Elector of Saxony, was elected king of Poland in 1697. Saxony, like most German states of the time had very strong anti-Roma legislation (Roma men were to be killed on sight, often with a bounty paid for their ears, while Roma women and children were disfigured, branded and banished) and upon Augustus' inauguration some of these laws were transferred to the Commonwealth. However, a distinction was made between the laws applicable in Augustus' home state of Saxony and the Commonwealth proper, where the most severe measures were mitigated into monetary fines or simply benign neglect of local authorities.

Shortly before the Partitions of Poland, Polska Roma, like other non-Szlachta classes, were granted full citizenship by the Constitution of 3rd May. However, these privileges were lost with the partitions and the Polska Roma were forced back into servile status by the foreign powers (Austria, Prussia, Russia).

During the Polish partitions

After Poland's partitions, the persecution of Polska Roma became more severe, particularly in the Russian partition. As a result, the group's population's size declined, at one point falling to as low as 1000 persons within Congress Poland. Another reason for the overall decline was that within the Prussian partition part of the group developed an identity, under the influence of German culture, distinct from those of other Polska Roma and subsequently became the Sasytka Roma. Finally, the 19th century saw an influx of other Romani into the territories of the former Polish–Lithuanian Commonwealth, particularly the Kalderash and Lovari. These groups competed economically against the Polska Roma within their traditional crafts and, in many places, successfully displaced them in terms of employment.

Interwar Poland

After Poland regained its independence, Polish authorities tended to recognize the Kalderash as the overall representatives of the Roma population in the country. Consequently, the "gypsy kings" during this period were chosen from among the Kalderash, and policy generally reflected this group's interests, often at the expense of the Polska Roma. Like most other Romani sub-groups within Poland who were not Kalderash, the latter did not recognize the authority of these representatives and did their best to ignore or circumvent it.

Porajmos

After the German invasion and occupation of Poland the Nazis carried out a planned genocide of the Roma population as part of the final solution. Polska Roma, along with other Romani groups in Poland were very much affected. Generally, while other Roma were usually placed in ghettos and then sent to Nazi concentration camps, the German SS usually murdered Polska Roma (as well as the Bergitka Roma) in mass executions in forests and secluded places (for example in the Szczurowa massacre).

After World War II

While prior to World War II a small portion of Polska Roma had become sedentary, most continued a traditional nomadic way of life. Unlike the Lovarii and Kalderash, who often engaged in cross-national Europe-wide travels, Polska Roma tended to stay within the borders of interwar Poland or neighboring countries.

After the war, however, the communist government of People's Poland instituted a policy aimed at the "settling" of the Roma population which had survived the Holocaust. Initially, this took the form of financial incentives - including free housing and "settlement funds" - but because the policy did not achieve the goals, the communist authorities hoped for, by the late 1950s the policy evolved into one of forced settlement and outright prohibitions against the "nomadic" lifestyle. All Polska Roma had to register, "vagrancy" was outlawed, and Roma's parents were often jailed if their children failed to attend the same school throughout the year (which was impossible in the context of a nomadic lifestyle). This forced policy resulted in about 80% of the previously nomadic Roma becoming settled, while a portion of the remainder went underground. Still, others emigrated abroad.

The Polska Roma poet Papusza (Bronisława Wajs) became nationally renowned during this period, as did her nephew, Edward Dębicki.

Polska Roma today

Currently, Polska Roma live mostly in southeastern Poland, in the area around Nowy Sącz, in Podhale and Spisz.

In June 1991 the Mława riot occurred, which was a series of violent incidents against Polska Roma that broke out after one Polish man was killed and another Polish man was permanently harmed when a Romani teenager drove into three ethnic Poles in a crosswalk, killing one, then fled the scene of the accident. After the accident a rioting mob attacked wealthy Romani settlements in the Polish town of Mława. Both the Mława police chief and University of Warsaw sociology researchers said that the pogrom was primarily due to class envy (some Romani have grown wealthy in the gold and automobile trades). At the time, the mayor of the town, as well as the Romani involved and other residents, said the incident was not racially motivated.

During the coverage of the riot, a change in ethnic stereotypes about Roma in Poland was mentioned: A Roma is no longer poor, dirty, or cheerful. They also do not beg or pretend to be lowly. Nowadays a Roma drives a high-status car, lives in a fancy mansion, flaunts his wealth, brags that the local authorities and the police are on his pay and thus he is not afraid of anybody. At the same time he is, as before, a swindler, a thief, a hustler, a dodger of military service and a holder of a legal, decent job. Negative "meta-stereotypes" – or the Romas' own perceptions regarding the stereotypes that members of the dominant groups hold about their own group – were described by the Polish Roma Society in an attempt to intensify the dialogue about exclusionism.

See also
Racism in Poland: Roma

References

Ethnic groups in Poland
Roma (Romani subgroup)
Romani in Poland
Romani groups